Only One Night (Swedish: En enda natt) is a 1939 Swedish romantic drama film directed by Gustaf Molander and starring Ingrid Bergman, Edvin Adolphson and Aino Taube. Bergman agreed to appear in the film in exchange for being given the lead role she sought in A Woman's Face the previous year.

Cast
 Ingrid Bergman as Eva Beckman 
 Edvin Adolphson as Valdemar Moreaux 
 Aino Taube as Helga Mårtensson 
 Olof Sandborg as Magnus von Brede 
 Erik 'Bullen' Berglund as Hagberg 
 Marianne Löfgren as Rosa 
 Magnus Kesster as Olsson
 Ragna Breda as Mrs. Krogh (uncredited)

References

Bibliography 
 Soila, Tytti. The Cinema of Scandinavia. Wallflower Press, 2005.

External links 
 

1939 films
1939 romantic drama films
1930s Swedish-language films
Films directed by Gustaf Molander
Swedish romantic drama films
Swedish black-and-white films
1930s Swedish films